Edward James Stanley DL JP (16 December 1826 – 29 September 1907), was a British Conservative politician  who sat in the House of Commons from 1882 to 1906.

Stanley was the son of Edward Stanley, of Cross Hall, Lancashire, a Deputy Lieutenant and Justice of the Peace for that county, and his wife Lady Mary Maitland, daughter of James Maitland, 8th Earl of Lauderdale. He was educated at Eton College and Christ Church, Oxford.  He was a Deputy Lieutenant and Justice of the Peace for both Somerset and Lancashire and was High Sheriff of Somerset in 1880.

Stanley was elected Member of Parliament for Somerset West at a by-election in 1882 and held the seat until it was reorganised under the Redistribution of Seats Act 1885. At the 1885 general election he was elected MP for Bridgwater and held the seat until he retired from the House of Commons in 1906 at the age of 79.

Stanley died in September 1907, aged 80.

In 1872 Stanley married the Hon. Mary Dorothy Labouchere, daughter of Henry Labouchere, 1st Baron Taunton and heir to the Quantock Lodge estate. His wife survived him by thirteen years and died in March 1920.

Stanley's branch of the Stanley family descended from Peter Stanley (d. c. 1686), younger son of Sir Thomas Stanley, 2nd Baronet, whose elder son Sir Edward Stanley, 3rd Baronet, was the ancestor of the branch of the family that have held the earldom of Derby since 1736.

Notes

References

External links 
 

Stanley (1826-1907), Edward
Stanley (1826-1907), Edward
People educated at Eton College
Alumni of Christ Church, Oxford
Conservative Party (UK) MPs for English constituencies
UK MPs 1880–1885
UK MPs 1885–1886
UK MPs 1886–1892
UK MPs 1892–1895
UK MPs 1895–1900
UK MPs 1900–1906
Deputy Lieutenants of Lancashire
High Sheriffs of Somerset